Siadehan or Siaden (Tati: , Siyâden), also known as Takestan ( Tâkestân), is a city and capital of Takestan County, in Qazvin Province, Iran. At the 2011 census its population was 120,907. Takestan has a railway station on the Teheran-Tabriz line.  The name Takestan literally means "vineyard".

People 
Most of the population of Takestan belong to the Tat ethnic group and Azerbaijanis. Takestan is the largest Tat-populated city in the world.

Historical sites
Pir Mausoleum: The Pir mausoleum, alternatively known as Pir-e Takestan and Imamzadeh Pir, is a small, domed building dating from the Seljuq-era 11th century and has since been restored. Only little of the original ornamental decorations remains.

References 

 Matheson, Sylvia A. (1972). Persia: An Archaeological Guide. London: Faber and Faber Limited. 

Populated places in Takestan County
Cities in Qazvin Province